Czechów may refer to:

Czechów, Lubusz Voivodeship, Poland
Czechów, Świętokrzyskie Voivodeship, Poland
Czechów Kąt

See also
 
 Czechow (disambiguation)
 Chekhov (disambiguation)
 Czechowicz